Mezilesí refers to the following places in the Czech Republic:

 Mezilesí (Náchod District)
 Mezilesí (Pelhřimov District)